Royal Jenesen Cathcart (April 8, 1926 – February 5, 2012) was an American football halfback who played for the San Francisco 49ers. He played college football at the University of California, Santa Barbara, having previously attended Long Beach Polytechnic High School in Long Beach, California. He was the brother of Sam Cathcart, who also played for the 49ers. Cathcart also was a line judge and side judge in the National Football League for 16 seasons from 1971 through 1986, wearing uniform number 16.

References

1926 births
2012 deaths
American football halfbacks
UC Santa Barbara Gauchos football players
San Francisco 49ers players
Players of American football from Oklahoma
People from Washita County, Oklahoma
National Football League officials